George Forester (21 December 1735 – 13 July 1811) was Member of Parliament for the borough constituency of Wenlock on several occasions between 1758 and 1785.  

He was the only son of Brooke Forester of Dothill in Wellington and Elizabeth daughter and heir of George Weld of Willey Park.  He died unmarried in 1811 having devised his estates to his cousin Cecil Forester, from 1811 Weld-Forester, and from 1820 1st Baron Forester.

References

Burkes Peerage (1939 edition)

1735 births
1811 deaths
Members of the Parliament of Great Britain for English constituencies
British MPs 1754–1761
British MPs 1768–1774
British MPs 1774–1780
British MPs 1780–1784
British MPs 1784–1790
People from Telford and Wrekin